Mikel Saizar Soroa (born 18 January 1983) is a Spanish professional footballer who plays as a goalkeeper for SD Amorebieta.

Club career
Born in Ibarra (Gipuzkoa), Saizar made his senior debut with Real Unión in the 2001–02 season, in the Segunda División B. In the summer of 2002 he joined Basque neighbours Real Sociedad, being assigned to the reserves also in the third tier.

Saizar continued to compete in the third division the following years, representing Pontevedra CF, Cultural y Deportiva Leonesa and CD Guadalajara. With the latter side, he achieved promotion to Segunda División in 2011.

On 27 August 2011, aged 28, Saizar made his debut as a professional, starting in a 1–1 home draw against UD Las Palmas. He played all 42 league games during the campaign, as the Castilla-La Mancha club narrowly avoided relegation.

On 10 July 2012, Saizar moved to Córdoba CF also in division two. He spent his first year as a backup to Alberto García.

Saizar renewed his contract with the Andalusians on 14 February 2013, and was an ever-present figure in 2013–14 as his team returned to La Liga after a 42-year absence. He made his debut in the competition on 21 February 2015, starting in a 1–2 home loss to Valencia CF.

Saizar cut ties with Córdoba on 21 July 2015, after suffering relegation. On 30 November of the following year, after spending one season as a backup to compatriot Toño at AEK Larnaca FC from the Cypriot First Division, he signed a one-year deal with CD Numancia. He played only once for the Soria-based club before dropping down a division to join Burgos CF, where he kept a clean sheet for the first nine games of the 2017–18 season before a 1–1 draw at CD Mirandés on 21 October.

Club statistics

References

External links

1983 births
Living people
People from Tolosaldea
Spanish footballers
Footballers from the Basque Country (autonomous community)
Association football goalkeepers
La Liga players
Segunda División players
Segunda División B players
Tolosa CF footballers
Real Unión footballers
Real Sociedad B footballers
Pontevedra CF footballers
Cultural Leonesa footballers
CD Guadalajara (Spain) footballers
Córdoba CF players
CD Numancia players
Burgos CF footballers
SD Amorebieta footballers
Cypriot First Division players
AEK Larnaca FC players
Spanish expatriate footballers
Expatriate footballers in Cyprus
Spanish expatriate sportspeople in Cyprus